Death Creek is a stream in northeastern Nevada and northwestern Utah, United States.

Death Creek was named in memory of an Indian who died near its banks.

See also

 List of rivers of Nevada
 List of rivers of Utah

References

Rivers of Box Elder County, Utah
Rivers of Elko County, Nevada
Rivers of Nevada
Rivers of Utah